The Roman Catholic Archdiocese of Cap-Haïtien, erected 3 October 1861 as the Diocese of Cap-Haïtien, is a metropolitan diocese, responsible for the suffragan Dioceses of Fort-Liberté, Hinche, Les Gonaïves and Port-de-Paix. It was elevated on 7 April 1988.

Bishops

Ordinaries
Constant-Mathurin Hillion (1872–1886), appointed Archbishop of Port-au-Prince
François-Marie Kersuzan (1886–1929)
Jean-Marie Jan (1929–1953)
Albert François Cousineau, C.S.C. (1953–1974); Archbishop (personal title) in 1968
François Gayot, S.M.M. (1974–2003)
Hubert Constant, O.M.I. (2003–2008)
Louis Nerval Kébreau, S.D.B. (2008–2014)
Max Leroy Mésidor, (2014-2017), appointed Archbishop of Port-au-Prince
Launay Saturné (2018-)

Coadjutor bishops
Jean-Marie Jan (1924-1929)
Albert François Cousineau, C.S.C. (1951-1953)
Max Leroy Mésidor (2013-2014)

External links

GCatholic.org page for the Archdiocese

Roman Catholic dioceses in Haiti
Religious organizations established in 1861
Cap-Haitien
1861 establishments in Haiti
Cap-Haïtien
A